The Palace of Darkened Windows is a 1920 American silent comedy-drama film directed by Henry Kolker and starring Claire Anderson, Arthur Edmund Carewe and Jay Belasco. It is based on the 1914 novel of the same title by Mary Hastings Bradley.

Cast
 Claire Anderson as Arlee Eversham
 Arthur Edmund Carewe as The Rajah
 Jay Belasco as 	Billy Hill
 Christine Mayo as 	Azade
 Gerald Pring as 	Captain Falconer
 Adele Farrington as Miss Eva Eversham
 Virginia Caldwell as	Mispah
 Nicholas Dunaew as The Snake Charmer

References

Bibliography
 Goble, Alan. The Complete Index to Literary Sources in Film. Walter de Gruyter, 1999.

External links
 

1920 films
1920 comedy-drama films
1920s English-language films
American silent feature films
Silent American comedy-drama films
American black-and-white films
Films directed by Henry Kolker
Selznick Pictures films
1920s American films